Oscar Montgomery (25 June 1895 – 6 June 1967) was a New Zealand cricket umpire. He stood in one Test match, New Zealand vs. England, in 1947.

See also
 List of Test cricket umpires
 English cricket team in New Zealand in 1946–47

References

1895 births
1967 deaths
People from Auckland
New Zealand Test cricket umpires